Bohemian Rapture or The Violin and the Dream is a 1947 Czech historical drama film directed by Václav Krška and starring Jaromír Spal, Václav Voska and Karel Dostal. The film portrays the life of the Czech violinist Josef Slavík, a contemporary of Frédéric Chopin, and a rival of Niccolò Paganini.

Cast
 Jaromír Spal as Josef Slavík
 Václav Voska as Frédéric Chopin  
 Karel Dostal as Nicolo Paganini  
 Vlasta Fabianová as Anna Zásmucká
 Libuše Zemková as Henrietta Astfeldová
 Jiřina Krejčová as Magdalenka  
 Marie Vášová as The Unknown Woman  
 Eduard Kohout as Count Pavel Adam Lažanský,
 Vladimír Řepa as Teacher W. W. Würfel
 František Smolík as Father Quardián
 Jarmila Švabíková as Constance Bayerová  
 Jiří Steimar as Baron Astfeld 
 Jan W. Speerger as Thug
 Zvonimir Rogoz as Conductor
 Karel Kalista as General Kučera

Release
The film premiered on 31 January 1947. In 1948 the film was released in the United States by the USSR distributor Artkino. This release is sometimes treated as a separate film, but is simply an English-subtitled version of the Czech original. The New York Times review of the film was negative, criticising it as "an unusual but decidedly confusing and unrewarding offering" and attacking in particular its use of disjointed flashback sequences.

References

Bibliography
 The Most Important Art: Eastern European Film After 1945. University of California Press, 1977.

External links
 
 

1947 films
1940s biographical drama films
1940s historical drama films
Czech biographical drama films
Czech historical drama films
1940s Czech-language films
Films directed by Václav Krska
Films set in the 1820s
Films set in the 1830s
Biographical films about musicians
Films about classical music and musicians
Cultural depictions of Frédéric Chopin
Cultural depictions of Niccolò Paganini
Cultural depictions of classical musicians
Czechoslovak black-and-white films
1947 drama films
1940s Czech films